The Association des Critiques et des journalistes de Bande Dessinée (ACBD) is a French association of comics, critics and journalists, who gave the Prix Bloody Mary from 1984 to 2003 and the Prix de la critique from 2004 until the present day. Since 2007 it gives the Prix Asie-ACBD during the Japan Expo. Every year the association publishes a report about the state of the comics industry in France.

External links
  

Comics-related organizations
French writers' organizations
French comics
Organizations established in 1984